Oenopota casentina is a species of sea snail, a marine gastropod mollusk in the family Mangeliidae.

Description
The length of the shell varies between 8 mm and 13 mm, its diameter 5 mm.

(Original description) The small, white shell contains about five whorls, the protoconch  decorticated. The whorls show a subangular shoulder in front of the anal fasciole. The axial sculpture consists of (on the penultimate whorl about 20) low, threadlike ribs extending from the shoulder to the succeeding suture, but more or less obsolete on the body whorl. The spiral sculpture consists of faint feeble striae on the fasciole. In front of the shoulder are numerous close-set flattish small threads, extending uniformly to the siphonal canal. The anal sulcus is shallow. The outer lip is slightly arcuate, the inner lip is erased. The columella is short, and straight. The siphonal canal is hardly differentiated.

Distribution
This species was found in the Bering Sea, north of Unalaska.

References

External links
 
 

casentina
Gastropods described in 1919